The SS Narkunda was a passenger ship commissioned in 1920 by the British shipping company, Peninsular and Oriental Steam Navigation Company, which carried passengers and mail from Great Britain to Australia and later to the Far East. From 1940 she served as a troop ship until she was sunk on November 14, 1942, on the Algerian coast during a German air raid.

Story 

The steamship Narkunda was ordered in 1913 and built by Harland & Wolff in Belfast, Northern Ireland. The First World War significantly delayed the construction of the ship. It was not until April 25, 1918, that the 16,227 GRT "Narkunda" could be launched at Harland & Wolff. Her sister ship, also commissioned in 1913, the SS Naldera (15,825 GRT), was built by Caird & Company in Greenock, Scotland was launched in December 1917.

The 177.22 meters long and 21.16 meter-long passenger and mail ship Narkunda had three funnels, two masts and two propellers and was powered by quadruple expansion steam engines, the 15,300 PSi and could accelerate the ship up to 17.5 knots. The passenger accommodations were designed for 426 passengers in first and 247 passengers in second class. The Narkunda and the Naldera were P&O's first three-chimney ships, the first with a rounded cruiser stern, and also the largest ships of the shipping company up to that point. The Narkunda left on March 30, 1920, on her maiden voyage. In its early years it was used in the mail service from England via the Mediterranean to Australia. In 1927, coal was converted to oil combustion. In 1931 she was transferred to the Far East route, calling at various ports.

After the outbreak of the Second World War, the Narkunda initially continued its passenger service and called at Shanghai and Cape Town, among other places, until 1940 when it was taken over by the British Admiralty when Troopship and Auxiliary Cruiser were drafted. It was used during the Allied invasion of North Africa (see Operation Torch).

After landing Allied troops in the Algerian port city of Bougie, the Narkunda under the command of Captain L. Parfitt, DSC, on the return journey to Great Britain. On the evening of November 14, 1942, the Narkunda was bombed and sunk not far from Bougie by German fighter pilots (position ). 31 people lost their lives. The Narkunda was the third and final P&O ship lost in the area. Captain Parfitt survived and was later awarded the Lloyd's War Medal for Bravery at Sea.

Citations

External links

Ships of P&O (company)
Steamships of the United Kingdom
1918 ships
Passenger ships of the United Kingdom
Troop ships of the United Kingdom
Ships built in Belfast
Ships built by Harland and Wolff
Ocean liners
Ships sunk by German aircraft